Del Norte is a Statutory Town that is the county seat of Rio Grande County, Colorado, United States. The town's name is most commonly pronounced /ˈdɛl nɔɹt/. The town population was 1,458 at the 2020 United States Census.

History
Del Norte is named from the river Rio Grande del Norte, or "large river of the north". There is abundant evidence in the area in the form of arrowheads and campsites of ancient peoples living around Del Norte thousands of years ago, such as the Folsom people. Afterwards, the Utes were known to live around Del Norte and the rest of the San Luis Valley, going back hundreds of years prior to Euro-American contact. They lived here temporarily in the warmer months because of the abundance of wild game, plants, water, and timber in the area – winters were often too cold and harsh for them to settle permanently. Spanish and Mexican peoples were the first non-natives to explore the nearby land, coming from Santa Fe and other parts of New Mexico. They were interested in surveying the 'Rio del Norte', or 'River of the North' – hence the origin of the town's name. This was the original name of the Rio Grande headwaters prior to numerous name changes over the years.

Under Mexican jurisdiction, Hispanic families began moving into the area during the early to mid-19th century as part of land grants to help the Mexican government fill and occupy the territory. However, large-scale settlements were difficult to establish because the Utes were weary and very hostile towards Euro-American settlement, and would chase off many people who attempted to do so. The most successful early settlement nearby was called 'La Loma', established a few miles east of where the current town site is today. This area was chosen because there was a particular section of the Rio Grande here where it could be crossed safely and easily – one of few known for miles during this time. After the Treaty of Guadalupe-Hidalgo was signed in 1848, jurisdiction of the land in and around Del Norte transferred from Mexico to the United States, but settlement by Americans in the area was delayed by civil strife (including the American Civil War) throughout the 1850s and 1860s. Most American settlements began in the area around the early 1870s, by prospectors searching the nearby mountains for minerals, such as gold and silver, particularly near an eventual boom-town named Summitville, located at the base of South Mountain near Bennett Peak.

These peaks in the San Juan Mountains were some of the last parts of Colorado where miners were allowed to explore and prospect for minerals, and they were finally able to do so after the Brunot Treaty was signed between the U.S. government and the Utes in 1873. Once the mines proved profitable, Del Norte was officially established around 1874, in order to serve as a base camp for the mines, not just in Summitville, but also in nearby Creede and Lake City. Miners quickly moved into the area, and they were followed by ranchers and farmers. Many of these original farming and ranching families still have operations and live in the Del Norte area to this day. After the Sherman Act was repealed in 1893, mining operations quickly became unprofitable and ceased. The 'glory days' of Del Norte ended as quickly as they began, but the community still survived because of ranching and agriculture. There was a small movement across southern Colorado throughout the late 1800s and early 1900s to secede from the State of Colorado and create the state of San Juan, with Del Norte becoming its capital city; however, this secession movement died quickly.

Del Norte would see cycles of boom and bust throughout the 20th century, but has recently become a blossoming community, due to the abundance of recreational activities provided by the area's unique geography, such as mountain biking, hiking, running, rock climbing, fishing, hunting, rafting and kayaking, cross country skiing, camping, etc.  Del Norte is also one of the communities which provides lodging for the nearby Wolf Creek Ski Area. Grande Avenue, the main street through Del Norte, still has many of the facades on its storefronts from the 1800s and early 1900s, reminding its residents and tourists of the town's historic past. In 2019, the Rio Grande National Forest announced that it will be moving its headquarters from nearby Monte Vista to Del Norte, and the town announced that it will be improving its riverwalk to include a white-water park along the Rio Grande.

Physical geography
 Del Norte's absolute location is at  (37.679015, -106.352976).  Relatively-speaking, it is located where the Rio Grande leaves the San Juan Mountains and enters the San Luis Valley, near its confluences with Pinos Creek and San Francisco Creek, respectively. Due to its location on the western edge of the valley, a variety of climates, vegetation regions, and ecosystems transition into each other at or around Del Norte. Within a twenty mile radius of the town, you can experience anything from alpine tundra, montane forests, to high-altitude desert. Common vegetation around Del Norte ranges from coniferous pine trees, deciduous aspen trees and cottonwoods, to sagebrush and cacti. During the warmer months of the year, hollyhock, cosmos, poppies, and sunflowers are frequently found around the town. Lookout Mountain (also known to locals as 'D' Mountain) overlooks the town, and is perhaps its most notable landmark. The classification of 'mountain' has been a misnomer, considering that 'D' Mountain has a mild prominence from the rest of the town (approximately 591 feet), and that there is nearby terrain with much greater prominence; however, the classification has stuck since early settlement.

Climate

Like most places in the San Luis Valley, Del Norte is generally categorized in a semi-arid or a high-altitude desert climate.  Precipitation is the main factor that determines this classification year-to-year, as it can fluctuate from as many as 10-12 inches annually in a wetter year, to 6 inches or less during a drought year. One reason precipitation varies greatly year-to-year is because the town is located in a rain shadow created by the San Juan Mountains. Because of this, precipitation is often determined by how strong and intense storm fronts are, and how these fronts move across the area. This explains why Wolf Creek Ski Area, located about 28 miles west of town, receives on average over 400 inches of snow per year, while Del Norte receives about 10% of that amount – about 40 inches of snow annually. Most precipitation falls in the form of rain or snow; hail and sleet are uncommon, but not unheard of. In general, one can expect in Del Norte to experience mild summers and cold winters, with spring and autumn varying between these. Springtime in the area generally includes gusty winds, and many of the year's strongest snowstorms actually happen during this season. Summer monsoons can hit the area as well, beginning in July and continuing through the end of September. During summer monsoons, the area generally experiences sunny mornings with clouds and storms moving in during the afternoon, and varying amounts of precipitation ranging from light drizzles of rain to brief, torrential downpours. Like most of Colorado, night time temperatures can drop quickly and intensely, because of the dry climate and the lack of moisture in the air.

Demographics

As of the census of 2000, there were 1,705 people, 657 households, and 446 families residing in the town. The racial makeup of the town was 66.86% White, 0.12% African American, 1.06% Native American, 0.41% Asian, 27.68% from other races, and 3.87% from two or more races. Hispanic or Latino of any race were 57.36% of the population.

There were 657 households, out of which 35.3% had children under the age of 18 living with them, 47.9% were married couples living together, 15.4% had a female householder with no husband present, and 32.1% were non-families. 29.4% of all households were made up of individuals, and 14.9% had someone living alone who was 65 years of age or older.  The average household size was 2.57 and the average family size was 3.19.

In the town, the population was spread out, with 30.2% under the age of 18, 9.4% from 18 to 24, 24.8% from 25 to 44, 22.9% from 45 to 64, and 12.8% who were 65 years of age or older.  The median age was 35 years. For every 100 females, there were 94.6 males.  For every 100 females age 18 and over, there were 90.7 males.

The median income for a household in the town was $23,833, and the median income for a family was $29,471. Males had a median income of $26,161 versus $21,406 for females. The per capita income for the town was $12,751.  About 22.1% of families and 25.4% of the population were below the poverty line, including 36.5% of those under age 18 and 14.0% of those age 65 or over.

Notable people born here 
Alva B. Adams-US Senator representing Colorado.
Kent Rominger-Astronaut attended Del Norte High School.

Gallery

See also

Colorado
Bibliography of Colorado
Index of Colorado-related articles
Outline of Colorado
List of counties in Colorado
List of municipalities in Colorado
List of places in Colorado
San Luis Valley

References

External links

Town of Del Norte website
CDOT map of the Town of Del Norte
Rio Grande Hospital Del Norte's major hospital

Towns in Rio Grande County, Colorado
Towns in Colorado
County seats in Colorado
Colorado populated places on the Rio Grande